Events from the year 1930 in Denmark.

Incumbents
 Monarch – Christian X
 Prime minister – Thorvald Stauning

Events

Sports

Date unknown
 B93 wins their fourth Danish football championship by winning the 1929–30 Danish Championship League.

Births
 9 January – Kate Mundt, actress (died 2004)
 30 March – Preben Kaas, actor (died 1981)
 17 September – Hardy Rafn, actor (died 1997)
 4 November – John Hahn-Petersen, actor (died 2006)

Deaths

 24 February – Hans Ole Brasen, painter (born 1849)
 28 February – Rasmus Andersen, sculptor (born 1861)
 22 April – Jeppe Aakjær, writer (born 1866)
 20 June – Kristian Erslev, historian (born 1852)
 2 November – Viggo Jensen, weightlifter, shooter, gymnast and athlete, Olympic gold medalist (Denmark's first) at the 1896 Summer Olympics (born 1874)
 28 November – Erik Henningsen, painter (born 1855)
 1 December – Peder Vilhelm Jensen-Klint, architect (born 1853)
 19 December – Jens Christian Christensen, politician, prime minister of Denmark (born 1856)

References

 
Denmark
Years of the 20th century in Denmark
1930s in Denmark
1930 in Europe